Peter Dean Gordeno (born 20 February 1964) is an English songwriter, producer and multi-instrumentalist, who has also been a live and session musician. Since 1998, he has toured with Depeche Mode. He performs keyboard parts in lieu of Alan Wilder, as well as occasional backing vocals and bass guitar. He and Andrew Phillpott went as backing musicians along with Martin Gore on a brief tour called "A Night with Martin L. Gore" in 2003.

References

External links
 A selection of his releases and contributions on discogs.com

1964 births
Living people
English session musicians
English keyboardists
English songwriters
Depeche Mode members
Musicians from London
People from Kensington
British synth-pop musicians
20th-century English musicians
21st-century English musicians
English people of Italian descent
English people of American descent
English people of Scottish descent
English people of Burmese descent